The National Organization for Women's Ecumenical Task Force on Women and Religion was created by feminist theologian Elizabeth Farians. The group played an important role in the creation of a Catholic feminist movement in the 1960s and early 1970s and worked for the ratification of the Equal Rights Amendment.

Creation of the task force 
The National Organization for Women was created in 1966, the same year the Ecumenical Task Force on Women and Religion was founded. It was founded by notable Catholic feminist, Dr. Elizabeth Farians. Regarding women in the church, Farians was famous for saying, "It's all right if they come with a cake with their hands, but if they come with an idea in their heads." In the late 1970s, Georgia Fuller served as the head of the task force.

In the early years of NOW, the role of religion was emphasized as many activists identified as faith based feminists. Scholars such as Karen Bojar have emphasized the religion was foundational to the founding of NOW since it was so important to Americans in general. The task force consisteted not only of Catholics, but Protestants and Jewish women as well.

Support for the Equal Rights Amendment 
Many of the members of the task force, including Farians, supported the Equal Rights Amendment.

Political history of the task force 
The organization lasted from 1966 to the 1970s. Many local chapters were created including one in Detroit in 1970 and another in Pensacola, Florida.

The archives of the task force are housed as the Schlesinger Library at Harvard College.

Support for women deacons 
Increasing leadership opportunities for women in religious communities was an important goal for the task force. The group endorsed the right for women to serve as deacons in 1971. This decision came as a result of the recommendation of 11 theologians.

Easter bonnet protest 
One of the most well documented actions of the task force was 1969 protest against a church requirement that women wear hats during service. During what Elizabeth Farians referred to as the "national unveiling", women took off their head coverings at a church in Milwaukee, Wisconsin.

Members 

 Sister Elizabeth Candon
 Valerie Elliott
 Elizabeth Farians
 Georgia Fuller
 Nancy Lee Head
 Ruth Hoppin
 Joyce Slayton Mitchell

References 

Catholic feminism
National Organization for Women
Feminist theology
Feminist theologians
Equal Rights Amendment organizations